Johannes Montanus (also Johannes Scultetus Montanus, 1531 - 11 June 1604) was Silesian doctor and Paracelsist known for describing terra sigillata from Strzegom.

Life
Johannes Montanus came from Striegau in Lower Silesia (now Strzegom, Poland). In 1563 he announced the discovery of terra sigillata, a medicinal clay, in the abandoned mines at Góra Bazaltowa; this variant is also called terra silesiaca. He subsequently found work as doctor of the Holy Roman Emperor Rudolf II in Prague. In 1587, he received an imperial privilege allowing him to mine and sell terra sigillata from Strzegom. He was also an important early collector of Paracelsian texts, some of which were used by Johannes Huser in his editions of Paracelsus' works.

Johannes Montanus died in 1604 and was buried in the Church of Sts. Peter and Paul in Strzegom.

Works
 Judieum de terra sigillata strigoviensis, 1563.

References

Notes

Bibliography
Strzegom. Zarys monografii miasta. Wrocław-Strzegom, 1998, pp. 93–94.
 Kühlmann, Wilhelm, and Joachim Telle. Corpus Paracelsisticum, vols. 1-3: Der Frühparacelsismus. Tübingen: Niemeyer, 2001-2004, and Berlin: Walter de Gruyter, 2013. Vol.2, pp. 239–41
 Spielvogel I., Spałek K., Johannes Montanus – lekarz ze Strzegomia i jego śląska glina lecznicza, 2, 170, Sudety 2019.

16th-century German physicians
16th-century births
1604 deaths
16th-century German writers
16th-century German male writers